The 1991 King of the Ring was the sixth King of the Ring professional wrestling tournament produced by the World Wrestling Federation (WWF, now WWE). The tournament was held on September 7, 1991 at the Providence Civic Center in Providence, Rhode Island as a special non-televised house show. The 1991 tournament was won by Bret Hart. In addition to the tournament, there was only one other match during the night. In this match The Beverly Brothers (Beau Beverly and Blake Beverly) defeated The Bushwhackers (Bushwhacker Butch and Bushwhacker Luke) in a tag team match. A tournament did not occur in 1992 but returned in 1993 as the promotion's annual June pay-per-view.

Production

Background
The King of the Ring tournament is a single-elimination tournament that was established by the World Wrestling Federation (WWF, now WWE) in 1985 with the winner being crowned the "King of the Ring." It was held annually until 1989. The event did not occur in 1990, but returned in 1991. The 1991 tournament was the sixth King of the Ring tournament. It was held on September 7, 1991 at the Providence Civic Center in Providence, Rhode Island and like the previous years, it was a special non-televised house show.

Storylines
The matches resulted from scripted storylines, where wrestlers portrayed heroes, villains, or less distinguishable characters in scripted events that built tension and culminated in a wrestling match or series of matches. Results were predetermined by the WWF's writers.

Aftermath
A tournament was not held in 1992, however, it returned in 1993. Starting with the 1993 King of the Ring, the tournament moved to the annual King of the Ring pay-per-view (PPV) event, held annually until the 2002 King of the Ring; that same year, the WWF was renamed to World Wrestling Entertainment (WWE). Following the 2002 event, the tournament would only be held periodically across episodes of Raw and SmackDown, although the final match of the 2006 tournament took place at the Judgment Day PPV, while the semifinals and finals of the 2015 tournament aired as a WWE Network-exclusive event.

Following his win in the 1993 tournament, Bret Hart became the only two-time King of the Ring winner.

Results

Tournament bracket

1.  Pete Doherty substituted for Kerry Von Erich.
2.  The Undertaker and Sid Justice were disqualified for attacking the referee. After the bout, Jake Roberts helped The Undertaker put Sid into the Casket.

References

1991
1991 in professional wrestling
1991 in Rhode Island
Events in Rhode Island
Professional wrestling in Providence, Rhode Island
September 1991 events in the United States